Nettle Creek may refer to:

Streams
Nettle Creek (Grass River), New York, United States
Nettle Creek (Mad River), Ohio, United States
Nettle Creek, Innot Hot Springs, Queensland, Australia

Populated places
Nettle Creek, Illinois, United States, an unincorporated community
Nettle Creek Township, Grundy County, Illinois